The Best Female Athlete with a Disability ESPY Award is an annual award honoring the achievements of a female individual from the community of disabled sports. Established with the aid of disability advocate and former United States Paralympic soccer player Eli Wolff, the accolade's trophy, designed by sculptor Lawrence Nowlan, is presented to the disabled sportswomen adjudged to be the best at the annual ESPY Awards ceremony in Los Angeles. The Best Female Athlete with a Disability ESPY Award was first bestowed as part of the ESPY Awards in 2005 after the non-gender specific Best Athlete with a Disability ESPY Award was presented the previous three years (all won by sportsmen). Balloting for the award is undertaken by fans over the Internet from between three and five choices selected by the ESPN Select Nominating Committee, which is composed of a panel of experts. It is conferred in July to reflect performance and achievement over the preceding twelve months.

The inaugural winner of the Best Female Athlete with a Disability ESPY Award at the 2005 ceremony was an American   swimmer named Erin Popovich, who is affected by achondroplasia.  She won seven gold medals at the 2004 Summer Paralympics in Athens. She is one of three people to have won the Best Female Athlete with a Disability ESPY Award more than once, winning again at the 2009 awards. Fellow swimmer Jessica Long has the most victories of any other sportswoman, collecting the award four times at the 2007, 2012, 2013 and 2022 ESPY Awards, with one further nomination at the 2009 ESPY Awards, while cross-country skier Oksana Masters has been nominated the most times (eight) without winning. Swimmers have been successful at the awards with nine victories and 13 nominations, followed by paratriathles with three wins and nine nominations. It was not awarded in 2020 due to the COVID-19 pandemic. The incumbent holder is American paralympic swimmer Jessica Long after being announced as the winner at the 2022 ESPY Awards.

Winners and nominees

Statistics

See also

 List of sports awards honoring women
 Best Male Athlete with a Disability ESPY Award
 United States Olympic Committee Paralympian of the Year Award
 Laureus World Sports Award for Sportsperson of the Year with a Disability

Notes

References

External links
 

Awards established in 2005
Disabled sports awards
ESPY Awards
Sports awards honoring women
Women's sports in the United States